Reham Khan is a 2018 controversial memoir written by Reham Khan. She is a former wife of Imran Khan, who later became Prime Minister of Pakistan in 2018. It was published on July 12, 2018 before the 2018 Pakistani general election, leading to claims that its publication was intended to damage Imran Khan's electoral prospects. The book was published by SK Publications in Pakistan and HarperCollins Publishers in India.

Allegations
Reham called Imran Khan a free-loader as he never bought any vegetables. Instead, he got them free from political colleagues like Jahangir Khan Tareen and Tariq Fazal Chaudhary. Other allegations revolve around corruption of Pervez Khattak and privatization scheme of Asad Umar in Khyber Pakhtunkhwa. She also alleged that Khattak used marijuana.

She alleged that Khan had addictions and claimed that Khan possessed drugs like tranquillisers including benzodiazepines like Xanax and Lexotanil.

Regarding Khan's sexual life, she alleged that Khan has gay tendencies. The two most noteworthy males mentioned are Murad Saeed and Hamza Ali Abbasi. The book claims that Khan had a sexual relationship with Uzma Kardar, Andleeb Abbas and transgender model Rimal Ali (which she denied). She wrote that Kardar regularly sexted Khan. She further claimed that Khan told her of a threesome he had in the 1980s with singer Grace Jones and a rock-model. Regarding children, she said that Khan told her that he had five illegitimate children.

Reham also claimed that Khan is a staunch believer of black magic, and practices it at his residence.

Reaction and reviews
A few days before the book was released, actor Hamza Ali Abbasi claimed that he had read a manuscript and criticized the book for being biased. Reham pointed out the fact that the book had been read illegally and claimed that Abbasi had been threatening her. This was followed by a number of accusations and quarrels between the two on Twitter.
Reham Khan faced legal challenges from people whom she made sexual claims about. She was sued by her former first husband Ijaz Rehman, former cricketer Wasim Akram, Zulfi Bukhari and Anila Khawaja.
Later, Imran Khan said in an interview that his marriage with Reham was his biggest mistake. Reham denies that there are any cases filed against her by saying that those are just social media threats.

Writing for The National, Sonali Kokra reviewed the book thus: "Tell-alls and memoirs, particularly by ex-spouses, are meant to be read as one side of a story, no matter how juicy the revelations are. Reham’s work is intriguing, but I read it with more than a pinch of salt."

References

External links

2018 non-fiction books
Cultural depictions of Imran Khan
Political memoirs
HarperCollins books